This is a list of Polish European Film Award winners and nominees. This list details the performances of Polish actors, actresses, and films that have either been submitted or nominated for, or have won, a European Film Award.

Main categories

Honorary awards

Selection

External links
 Nominees and winners at the European Film Academy website

See also
 List of Polish Academy Award winners and nominees
 List of Polish submissions for the Academy Award for Best Foreign Language Film

European Film Award winners and nominees
European Film Academy Awards
European Film Award winners and nominees